Isak Ocke Danielson (born 27 August 1997) is a Swedish singer and songwriter. He is best known for his song "Always" and his albums Yours (2018) and Remember to Remember Me (2020).

Early life
Danielson was born on 27 August 1997 and has two older sisters. The family grew up in Hovås, south of Gothenburg. His father, Måns Danielson, is one of the founders of the online food company Mat. The family lived in London from 2008 to 2010, where Danielson attended Tring Park School for the Performing Arts and was trained in theatre and singing. Danielson said of this time "I learned to sing classically and use the diaphragm. My voice evolved and I got better at singing."

Career

2012: The X Factor
Danielson's breakthrough came in 2012, where he successfully auditioned for The X Factor Sweden, where he eventually placed third.

2013-2017: Career beginnings and EPs 
In December 2013, Danielson uploaded his debut single "Long Live This Love" onto YouTube, before its official release in January 2014 by TEN Music Group.

In January 2015, Danielson released "Falling Into You", the lead single from his debut EP Volume One which was released in March 2015. A Scandipop review called the EP "A six track collection that is seemingly tailored specifically to showcase what we believe to be one of the best male voices in Scandinavian pop music. It's a mixture of soulful ballads, with a couple of acoustic folk pop romps thrown in for good measure."

In October 2016, Danielson released his second EP, titled Volume Two, which was preceded by the single "Remember" in September.

In April 2017, Danielson's track "Ending" was featured in a choreography video posted by Maddie Ziegler and in September 2017 the song was also featured on American program So You Think You Can Dance and again in the American television series Cloak & Dagger. These events saw an increase in his streaming numbers around the world.

2018-2020: Yours and Remember to Remember Me
In April 2018, Danielson released "Broken", the lead single from his forthcoming debut studio album. Danielson said was inspired by a friend who had experienced a number of sexual assaults.

In July 2018, Danielson released "Always", which was followed by "I'll Be Waiting" in September and "I'm Falling in Love" in October. On 19 October 2018, Danielson released his debut studio album Yours. Yours peaked at number 27 on the Swedish charts.

In January 2019, Danielson released "Power" which was followed by "Bleed Out" on 5 March. Both tracks were the lead singles from his third EP, titled Run to You, which was released on 29 March 2019.

In September 2019, Danielson released "Silence", his first on new IOD label, after signing with Universal Music Group.

In April 2020, Danielson released his second studio album, Remember to Remember Me. The album title is a message to the listener to follow along on his personal journey, where no topic is too delicate to explore. In the songs "Light Up", "Silence" and "Religion", Danielson reflects on his own relationship with anxiety and his message that no one should ever feel alone in their struggle with anxiety.

Per Magnusson from Aftonbladet gave the album 3 out of 5 saying "Isak Danielson makes pop music so emotional and sad that it almost forgets to breathe" and that "he sings well beyond his age".

2021: Tomorrow Never Came and King of a Tragedy 
On 5 March 2021, Danielson released Tomorrow Never Came, followed by the EP Live in Stockholm in July 2021.

Danielson's fourth studio album, King of a Tragedy, was released on 8 April 2022.

Discography

Albums

Extended plays

Singles

References

Living people
1997 births
Swedish pop singers
Swedish songwriters
Swedish-language singers
English-language singers from Sweden
21st-century Swedish singers
21st-century Swedish male singers
Musicians from Gothenburg
Singers from Gothenburg